Katharine Stephen (26 February 1856 – 16 June 1924) was a librarian and later principal of Newnham College at Cambridge University.

Early life and family 
Katharine Stephen was born in London on 26 February 1856, the daughter of Mary Richenda Cunningham (1829–1912) and James Fitzjames Stephen (1829–1894), a judge. She was the niece of Caroline Stephen and of Leslie Stephen and the cousin of Virginia Woolf and Vanessa Bell.

Work 
Katharine Stephen worked at Newnham College, Cambridge. She first joined the college as Helen Gladstone's secretary, and worked with Anne Jemima Clough to teach working men on Sunday mornings in St Matthew's Schoolroom, Barnwell. She was appointed Librarian of Newnham's 'first purpose-built library' in 1888. She went on to become Vice-Principal and, in 1911, Principal of the college during the First World War years, and kept her seat on the Council after her retirement in 1920.

Stephen sat for a portrait by her cousin Vanessa Bell but that painting is lost. The painting at Newnham College is by Glyn Philpot.

Stephen died of cancer on 16 June 1924 at her home in South Kensington. Stephen was loyal to her family. Every day she would either see her mother or write her a letter. Her aunt, Caroline Stephen, was another relative; she was a friend too. Caroline came to live in Cambridge in 1895 where she evangelised her Quaker beliefs to Newnham students. Caroline's final book contained a biography written by Katherine.

Legacy
The Katharine Stephen Rare Books Library at Newnham was built in 1981-82. It was designed by Joanna van Heyningen and was listed Grade II in 2018 with other post-modern buildings.

Publications 
 French History for English Children  (1881), under the pseudonym Sarah Brook.
 Three Sixteenth Century Sketches (1884), under the pseudonym Sarah Brook.

References 

1856 births
1924 deaths
British women academics
Daughters of baronets
Deaths from cancer in England
English librarians
Principals of Newnham College, Cambridge
British women librarians